Transient hypogammaglobulinemia of infancy is a form of hypogammaglobulinemia appearing after birth, leading to a reduction in the level of IgG, and also sometimes IgA and IgM. (The ratios of immunoglobulins vary rapidly in all infants, and the term dysgammaglobulinemia, although theoretically applicable, is not usually used in this context.)

It can result in increased infections, but it can also present without symptoms.

Pathophysiology 
Normally, a newborn's immunoglobulins come from the mother during pregnancy and wane after birth until 3-6 months of age, when the infant begins to start to produce their own IgG. However, in transient hypogammaglobulinemia of infancy, the IgG synthesis is delayed, and the hypogammaglobulinemia is prolonged beyond age 6 months.

See also 
 List of cutaneous conditions

References

External links 

Noninfectious immunodeficiency-related cutaneous conditions
Predominantly antibody deficiencies